Tiffany Donnama James (born 31 January 1997) is a Jamaican athlete. She competed in the women's 4 × 400 metres relay at the 2018 IAAF World Indoor Championships. In 2014, she competed in the girls' 400 metres event at the 2014 Summer Youth Olympics held in Nanjing, China.

References

External links
 

1997 births
Living people
Jamaican female sprinters
Place of birth missing (living people)
Athletes (track and field) at the 2014 Summer Youth Olympics
Central American and Caribbean Games gold medalists for Jamaica
Competitors at the 2018 Central American and Caribbean Games
Athletes (track and field) at the 2019 Pan American Games
Pan American Games bronze medalists for Jamaica
Pan American Games medalists in athletics (track and field)
World Athletics Championships athletes for Jamaica
World Athletics Championships medalists
Central American and Caribbean Games medalists in athletics
Medalists at the 2019 Pan American Games
World Athletics Indoor Championships winners
20th-century Jamaican women
21st-century Jamaican women